Triplophysa hexiensis is a species of stone loach endemic to China. It is known from Ruo Shui and Shiyang Rivers in northern China.

References

hexiensis
Freshwater fish of China
Endemic fauna of China
Fish described in 1988